Epsilon Columbae, Latinized from ε Columbae, is a star in the southern constellation of Columba. It is visible to the naked eye, having an apparent visual magnitude of 3.87. The star is drifting closer with a radial velocity of −5 km/s.

This is an orange-hued K-type giant star with a stellar classification of K1 II/III. At the age of 1.5 billion years old, it has exhausted the supply of hydrogen at its core then cooled and expanded off the main sequence. Epsilon Columbae has 2.5 times the mass and 25 times the radius of the Sun. Based upon changes in the star's movement, it has an orbiting stellar companion of unknown type.

References

K-type giants
Runaway stars
Columba (constellation)
Columbae, Epsilon
Durchmusterung objects
036597
025859
01862